Arkadi Ivanovich Krasavin (born 5 January 1967) is a Russian professional football coach and a former player.

Playing career
He played for the main squad of FC Dynamo Moscow in the USSR Federation Cup.

External links
 

1967 births
People from Kostroma
Living people
Soviet footballers
Russian footballers
Russian Premier League players
FC Dynamo Moscow players
FC Dynamo Stavropol players
FC Chernomorets Novorossiysk players
FC Baltika Kaliningrad players
Russian football managers
FC Volgar Astrakhan players
FC Yugra Nizhnevartovsk players
Association football defenders
FC Spartak Kostroma players
Sportspeople from Kostroma Oblast